The 26th World Cup season began in November 1991 in the United States and concluded in March 1992 in Switzerland.  The overall winners were Paul Accola of Switzerland, his first, and Petra Kronberger of Austria, her third straight.

A major change during this season was made to the scoring system, moving from a "Top 15" system, with 25 points for first, 20 for second, and 15 for third down to 1 for 15th, to a "Top 30" system, with 100 for first, 80 for second, and 60 for third down to 1 for 30th. A slight change was made to the points awarded at lower levels in 1992-93, and that revised system has remained in effect until the present.  This was also the first season after the dissolution of Yugoslavia into multiple nations, with its traditional skiing resorts (Kranjska Gora and Maribor) becoming part of Slovenia, and the Soviet Union also dissolved during this season, on 25/26 December 1991.
 
A break in the schedule in February was for the 1992 Winter Olympics in Albertville, France from 9-22 February.

Calendar

Men

Ladies

Men

Overall 

see complete table

In Men's Overall World Cup 1991/92 all results count.

Downhill 

see complete table

In Men's Downhill World Cup 1991/92 all results count. Swiss athletes won seven races out of nine.

Super G 

see complete table

In Men's Super G World Cup 1991/92 all results count.

Giant Slalom 

see complete table

In Men's Giant Slalom World Cup 1991/92 all results count. Alberto Tomba won his third Giant Slalom World Cup.

Slalom 

see complete table

In Men's Slalom World Cup 1991/92 all results count. Alberto Tomba won six races and finished every race on the podium.

Combined 

see complete table

In Men's Combined World Cup 1991/92 all three results count. Paul Accola was able to win all three competitions.

Ladies

Overall 

see complete table

In Women's Overall World Cup 1991/92 all results count. Petra Kronberger captured her third Overall World Cup win in a row despite having only two wins, both in downhill races. But she was able to score points in all but five competitions under the new "Top 30" scoring system. By contrast, Carole Merle won seven races and, according to the points system used from the following year onwards, she would have won this overall World Cup -- which was part of the motivation underlying the point value change before the following season.

Downhill 

see complete table

In Women's Downhill World Cup 1991/92 all results count.

Super G 

see complete table

In Women's Super G World Cup 1991/92 all results count. Carole Merle won her fourth Super G World Cup in a row.

Giant Slalom 

see complete table

In Women's Giant Slalom World Cup 1991/92 all results count.

Slalom 

see complete table

In Women's Slalom World Cup 1991/92 all results count. Vreni Schneider won her third Slalom World Cup.

Combined 

see complete table

In Women's Combined World Cup 1991/92 both results count.

Nations Cup

Overall

Men

Ladies

References

External links
FIS-ski.com - World Cup standings - 1992

FIS Alpine Ski World Cup
World Cup
World Cup